On the Top of the Cherry Tree ( / ) is a 1984 Bulgarian comedy-drama film directed by Mariana Evstatieva — Biolcheva, starring Veselin Prahov, Todor Trankarov, Konstantin Kotsev and Anton Gorchev.

The movie is in the scope of the so-called “Childhood genre”, featuring children in the main parts. In some way it is a sequel of A Dog in a Drawer released two years earlier, both films written by Rada Moskova and starring the child actor Veselin Prahov. The main characters are again urban kids and teenagers with busy parents. They wander in the neighborhood in search of stories, usually using their unadulterated imagination. On the Top of the Cherry Tree strengthened Prahov's status as a superstar of the Bulgarian cinema from the 1980s. The movie became one of the hits of that time.

Cast
In the roles of the children are:
Veselin Prahov as Lin
Todor Trankarov as Tony 
Tsvetana Uzunova as Ina
Emil Dimitrov as Emil

In the roles of the adults are:
Konstantin Kotsev as Peshev
Mincho Minchev as himself, the violinist
Anton Gorchev as Tony's father
Lyben Chatalov as Lin's father
Rositsa Grigorova as Lin's mother
Lyuba Aleksieva as Grandma Tsetska
Pavel Popandov as a dogs trader

References

Sources

External links
 
 On the Top of the Cherry Tree at the Bulgarian National Television 

1980s Bulgarian-language films
1984 films
Bulgarian comedy-drama films
Films set in Bulgaria
Films shot in Bulgaria
1984 comedy-drama films